Juniskär is a locality situated in Sundsvall Municipality, Västernorrland County, Sweden with 397 inhabitants in 2010.

References 

Populated places in Sundsvall Municipality
Medelpad